Grémonville is a commune in the Seine-Maritime department in the Normandy region in northern France.

Geography
The A29 autoroute passes through the southern section of the commune's territory.

Heraldry

Population

Places of interest
 The church of Sts.Pierre and Paul, dating from the eighteenth century.
 A seventeenth-century château in Louis XIII style.
 A chapel, built on the site of the old priory.

Notable people
 Micheline Ostermeyer, (1922–2001), a track and field athlete and pianist, spent her last years here.

See also
Communes of the Seine-Maritime department

References

Communes of Seine-Maritime